Ennio Tardini (8 September 1879 – 16 August 1923) was an Italian lawyer who laid out the plans for the Stadio Ennio Tardini during his chairmanship of Parma A.C. Completion of the stadium's construction was after the death of Tardini. He also sat on the town council during the administration of Lusignan as his passion for sport was found in liberal politics, where he was at the heart of 1908's great agricultural strike of 1908, a precursor to the battles of the unions, which ran from 1919 to 1921, and led to the agricultural agreements.

References

Parma Calcio 1913 chairmen and investors
Italian football chairmen and investors
1879 births
1923 deaths